Australian special interests Ambassadors and Envoys are specially-appointed officers of Australia's Department of Foreign Affairs and Trade to represent the interests of the Commonwealth of Australia abroad on a larger scale (such as by continent) or through representing the Commonwealth's approach to various international issues. While the special interest Ambassadors-at-Large are appointed in the same manner as would a normal Ambassador Extraordinary and Plenipotentiary, they are not credentialed to any state and thus have no treaty-making powers. Special Envoys are typically appointed by the Prime Minister of Australia.

Special interests ambassadors

Ambassadors for Counter-Terrorism

Ambassadors for the Environment

Ambassadors for Climate Change

Ambassadors for Cyber Affairs and Critical Technology

Ambassadors for Regional Health Security

Ambassador for People Smuggling and Human Trafficking

Ambassadors for Gender Equality

Ambassadors for Human Rights

Special Envoys

Special Envoy to the Organisation of Islamic Cooperation, Ahmed Fahour, 29 June 2011–date.
Special Envoy to Eastern Europe, the Balkans and the Caucasus, Russell Trood, 2011–2012.
Special Envoy to Africa
Bob McMullan, 2010–2012.
Malcolm Fraser, 1996–1999.
Special Envoy to La Francophonie, Bill Fisher, 2010–2013.
Special Envoy on Whale Conservation, Sandy Hollway, 2008–2009

See also
 Foreign relations of Australia

References

External links

Foreign relations of Australia